Since the 1930s English has created numerous portmanteau words using the word English as the second element. These refer to varieties of English that are heavily influenced by other languages or that are typical of speakers from a certain country or region. The term can mean a type of English heavily influenced by another language (typically the speaker's L1) in accent, lexis, syntax, etc., or to the practice of code-switching between languages.

In some cases, the word refers to the use of the Latin alphabet to write languages that use a difference script, especially common on computer platforms that only allow Latin input such as online chat, social networks, emails and SMS.

The practice of forming new words in this way has become increasingly popular since the 1990s and one scholarly article lists 510 such terms, known as "lishes".

The following is a list of lishes that have Wikipedia pages.

Common lishes 

 Amerglish – American English
 Arablish - a mixture of Arabic and English
 Auslish – Australian English
 Benglish – a mixture of Bengali and English
 Bislish – a mixture of Visayan and English
 Brenglish – British English
 Brunglish – Brunei English
 Canadinglish - Canadian English
 Chinglish – a mixture of Chinese and English; Chinese English
 Czenglish – a mixture of Czech and English
 Danglish – a mixture of Danish and English
 Denglisch – a mixture of German and English
 Dunglish – a mixture of Dutch and English
 Espanglish = Spanglish 
 Eurolish – European English
 Finglish – a mixture of Finnish and English
 Frenglish – a mixture of French and English; Franglais
 Germlish - a mixture of German and English; Denglisch 
 Greeklish – a mixture of Greek and English
 Heblish – a mixture of Hebrew and English
 Hinglish – a mixture of Hindi and English
 Hunglish – a mixture of Hungarian and English
 Indlish – Indian English
 Itanglish – a mixture of Italian and English; Itanglese
 Janglish – a mixture of Japanese and English; Wasei-eigo (not to be confused with Engrish)
 Kanglish – a mixture of Kannada and English
 Kiwilish – New Zealand English
 Konglish – a mixture of Korean and English
 Manglish – a mixture of Malay and English
 Namlish – Namibian English
 Nepanglish – a mixture of Nepali and English
 Nihonglish – a mixture of Japanese and English; Janglish
 Ozlish – Australian English
 Paklish – Pakistani English
 Pinglish – Pakistani English; Palestine English; Persian English; Polish English; Punjabi English
 Poglish - a mixture of Polish and English
 Porglish - a mixture of Portuguese and English
 Punjlish - a mixture of Punjabi and English
 Runglish - a mixture of Russian and English
 Siculish - a mixture of Sicilian and English
 Singlish - Colloquial Singaporean English
 Spanglish - a mixture of Spanish and English
 Swenglish - a mixture of Swedish and English
 Taglish - a mixture of Tagalog and English
 Tanglish - a mixture of Tamil and English
 Tenglish - a mixture of Telugu and English
 Tinglish - a mixture of Thai and English
 Uglish - Ugandan English
 Vietglish - a mixture of Vietnamese and English
 Wenglish - a mixture of Welsh and English; Welsh English
 Yanklish – American English
 Yeshivish - Yeshiva English
 Yidlish - a mixture of Yiddish and English
 Zimblish - Zimbabawean and English

References

Further reading 
 
 
 
 
 
 

 
Portmanteaus